Ian Somerville (born September 1, 2000) is an American ice dancer. With his skating partner, Emily Bratti, he competed in the final segment at the 2022 Four Continents Championships.

With his former skating partner, Katarina DelCamp, he is the 2021 U.S. junior national bronze medalist. With his former skating partner, Eliana Gropman, he is the 2019 U.S. national junior bronze medalist and the 2018 JGP Slovakia bronze medalist. They placed in the top twelve at the 2019 World Junior Championships.

Personal life 
Ian Somerville was born September 1, 2000, in Washington, D.C. to real estate appraisers Catherine and Scott Somerville. He has an older sister named Lauren. Somerville graduated from Walt Whitman High School in Bethesda, Maryland. He is fluent in French and has attended bilingual English/French schools since preschool. Somerville is a fan of the Washington Football Team and owns two Wheaten Terriers named Divi and Margot.

Career

Early career 
Somerville began skating at age four as a recreational activity. Gropman/Somerville announced their partnership in June 2008. They did not compete during the 2010–11 season after Somerville and his family moved to France for nine months. Together, they are the 2012 U.S. national juvenile and 2013 U.S. national intermediate champions, as well as the 2014 U.S. national novice silver medalists. They did not advance to the 2015 U.S. Championships, after placing fifth at 2015 Eastern Sectionals.

2015–2016 season 
Gropman/Somerville received their first ISU Junior Grand Prix assignment, placing tenth at 2015 JGP United States in Colorado Springs, Colorado. They won bronze at Midwestern Sectionals and finished seventh at the 2016 U.S. Championships. Gropman/Somerville then competed at the 2016 Bavarian Open, where they won silver behind Shevchenko/Eremenko of Russia.

2016–2017 season 
Gropman/Somerville opened their season with the bronze medal at 2016 Lake Placid Ice Dance International behind U.S. teammates Parsons/Parsons and Lewis/Bye. They finished ninth at 2016 JGP France and fifth at 2016 NRW Trophy. Gropman/Somerville won bronze at Eastern Sectionals and finished sixth at the 2016 U.S. Championships.

2017–2018 season 
Gropman/Somerville began the season with a pair of fourth-place finishes at 2017 JGP Australia and 2017 JGP Croatia. They won silver at Eastern Sectionals and earned their first junior national medal, pewter, at the 2017 U.S. Championships.

2018–2019 season 
Gropman/Somerville won their first JGP medal, a bronze, at 2018 JGP Slovakia behind Russians Khudaiberdieva/Nazarov and Shanaeva/Naryzhnyy. They placed fifth at 2018 JGP Canada. Gropman/Somerville won gold at Midwestern Sectionals and bronze at the 2019 U.S. Championships. With their result, they were named to the team for the 2019 World Junior Championships for the first time, alongside Green/Green and Nguyen/Kolesnik. 

At the 2019 Junior Worlds, Gropman/Somerville were ninth after the rhythm dance but fell to twelfth overall following a thirteenth-place free dance. Somerville and Gropman dissolved the partnership at the end of the season.

2019–2020 season 
Somerville teamed up with Katarina DelCamp in 2019. They placed tenth at 2019 JGP Croatia and fourth at 2019 JGP Italy. DelCamp/Somerville won the bronze medal at the inaugural U.S. Ice Dance Final behind Wolfkostin/Chen and Cesanek/Yehorov. They then finished fifth at the 2020 U.S. Championships and, as a result, were assigned to Egna Dance Trophy. DelCamp/Somerville won their first international medal, silver, at Egna Trophy behind teammates Cesanek/Yehorov.

2020–2021 season 
In their lone event of the pandemic-shortened season, DelCamp/Somerville won the bronze medal at the 2021 U.S. junior championships. Somerville dissolved the partnership afterward.

2021–2022 season 
After ending his partnership with DelCamp, Somerville formed a new partnership with Emily Bratti, who he had known for three years while she trained at the same facility with a different partner. They moved to train with Charlie White and Greg Zuerlein at the newly-opened Michigan Ice Dance Academy in Canton, Michigan.

Bratti/Somerville made their international debut on the Challenger series at the 2021 CS Cup of Austria, finishing eighth. They went on to place fifth at the 2021 CS Golden Spin of Zagreb. At their senior national debut at the 2022 U.S. Championships, Bratti/Somerville were fifth. This placement earned them an assignment to the 2022 Four Continents Championships in Tallinn, where they also finished fifth. Somerville said he looked forward to the off-season and having more time to improve the partnership.

2022–23 season 
Bratti and Somerville's summer training was disrupted in June after a fall in a lift resulted in Bratti fracturing a bone in her face and requiring three root canal surgeries to repair damage to her teeth. Eventually they resumed training, though they did not attempt lifts again for over a month afterward.

Bratti/Somerville began the season at the Lake Placid Ice Dance International, coming in fourth. They were fourth as well at the 2022 CS Lombardia Trophy. Invited to make their Grand Prix debut at the 2022 Skate Canada International, the team finished in sixth place. They won the gold medal at the 2022 CS Ice Challenge, their first Challenger title.

Finishing the season at the 2023 U.S. Championships, Bratti/Somerville placed fifth for the second consecutive year.

Programs

With Bratti

With DelCamp

With Gropman

Competitive highlights 
JGP: Junior Grand Prix. Pewter medals (4th place) awarded only at U.S. national, sectional, and regional events.

With Bratti

With DelCamp

With Gropman

References

External links 
 Katarina DelCamp / Ian Somerville at the International Skating Union
 Eliana Gropman / Ian Somerville at the International Skating Union

2000 births
American male ice dancers
Living people
Figure skaters from Washington, D.C.
Walt Whitman High School (Maryland) alumni